13th New York Film Critics Circle Awards
January 19, 1948(announced December 28, 1947)

Gentleman's Agreement
The 13th New York Film Critics Circle Awards, announced on 19 January 1948, honored the best filmmaking of 1947.

Winners
Best Film:
Gentleman's Agreement
Best Actor:
William Powell - Life with Father and The Senator Was Indiscreet
Best Actress:
Deborah Kerr - Black Narcissus and The Adventuress
Best Director:
Elia Kazan - Gentleman's Agreement
Best Foreign Language Film:
To Live in Peace (Vivere in pace) • Italy

References

External links
1947 Awards

1947
New York Film Critics Circle Awards, 1947
1947 in American cinema
1947 in New York City